The 1984 Mercedes Cup, was a men's tennis tournament played on outdoor clay courts and held at the Tennis Club Weissenhof in Stuttgart, West Germany that was part of the 1984 Grand Prix circuit. It was the seventh edition of the tournament and was held from 16 July until 22 July 1984. Seventh-seeded Henri Leconte won the singles title.

Finals

Singles

 Henri Leconte defeated  Gene Mayer, 7–6(11–9), 6–0, 1–6, 6–1
 It was Leconte's 1st singles title of the year and the 2nd of his career.

Doubles

 Sandy Mayer /  Andreas Maurer defeated  Fritz Buehning /  Ferdi Taygan, 7–6, 6–4

References

External links
 Official website 
 ATP tournament profile

Stuttgart Open
Stuttgart Open
Stuttgart Open
Stuttgart Open
German